"These Lips Don't Know How to Say Goodbye" is a song written by Harlan Howard and recorded by American country music group The Forester Sisters for their 1988 album Sincerely.  It was later recorded by Doug Stone and released in October 1990 as the third single from the album Doug Stone.  The song reached number 5 on the Billboard Hot Country Singles & Tracks chart.

Music video
The music video was directed and produced by Deaton Flanigen and premiered in late 1990.

Chart performance

Year-end charts

References

1990 singles
The Forester Sisters songs
Doug Stone songs
Songs written by Harlan Howard
Music videos directed by Deaton-Flanigen Productions
Epic Records singles
Song recordings produced by Doug Johnson (record producer)
1988 songs